The Patriots' Path is a multi-use trail system in Morris County, New Jersey, open to cyclists, hikers, and horseback riders, consisting of a  main trail and  of spur trails.  The main trail is marked with white blazes or a white circular blaze with a brown tree.  The spur trails are marked with blue blazes or a white circle with a blue tree, while the side spur trails are marked with a red blaze or a white circle with a red tree.

Description 
Patriots' Path stretches from East Hanover, where it connects with the Lenape Trail in Essex County, to Allamuchy Mountain State Park in Sussex County, and the Village of High Bridge in Hunterdon County.  In southern Morris County, the path travels mostly along the corridors of the Whippany River, Black River, and Raritan River.  Different portions of Patriots' Path include bike trails (paved), cross-country skiing, equestrian trails, and hiking trails (handicap accessible). Parts of the trail are along the right-of-way of the former Rockaway Valley Railroad.

The Patriots’ Path is a part of two other larger trail systems. It is included in the Liberty–Water Gap Trail and the September 11th National Memorial Trail.

The Patriots’ Path is a popular location for scouts to complete their Eagle Project. Some of the Eagle Projects that scouts have completed on the Patriots’ Path include installing benches, extending the trail and installing proper signage, and trail renovation and beautification. A particularly popular project to complete is installing a footbridge on the trail.

Points of interest
 Bamboo Brook Outdoor Education Center
 Frelinghuysen Arboretum
 Acorn Hall
 Ford Mansion
 Pocahontas Lake
 Speedwell Ironworks
 Lewis Morris County Park
 Jockey Hollow
 Black River Wildlife Management Area
 Nathan Cooper Gristmill
 Chubb Park
 Ken Lockwood Gorge WMA
 Schooley's Mountain County Park
 Elizabeth D. Kay Environmental Center
 Willowwood Arboretum
 New Jersey Brigade Encampment Site – Morristown National Historical Park
 Washington Valley Historic District

Gallery

See also

 Whippany River
 Hanover Township
 Whippany River Watershed Action Committee
 Frelinghuysen Arboretum

References

External links
 

Rail trails in New Jersey
Bike paths in New Jersey
National Recreation Trails in New Jersey